Meloria north end Lighthouse is an active lighthouse located in the Ligurian Sea,  north of Meloria south end Lighthouse and  north west of Livorno, in the northern part of the Meloria shoal.

Description
The light is operated by the Marina Militare and it is identified by the code number 1884 E.F.

See also
 List of lighthouses in Italy
 Meloria south end Lighthouse

References

External links 
 Servizio Fari Marina Militare 

Lighthouses in Italy
Lighthouses in Tuscany